Francisco Andrés Pizzini (born 19 September 1993 in Bahía Blanca) is an Argentine football player, who plays as a winger for Talleres.

Club career
Pizzini debuted with Independiente in a 0 - 3 defeat against All Boys on 12 May 2012.
In July 2014 he scored the only 2 goals of the match against Belgrano for the round of 16 of the 2013–14 Copa Argentina.

References

External links
 Independiente profile 
 

1993 births
Living people
Argentine footballers
Sportspeople from Bahía Blanca
Argentine people of Italian descent
Association football midfielders
Club Atlético Independiente footballers
Club Olimpo footballers
Defensa y Justicia footballers
Talleres de Córdoba footballers
Argentine Primera División players